Mysovtsevo is a rural locality (a village) in Zhukovsky Selsoviet, Ufimsky District, Bashkortostan, Russia. The population was 259 as of 2010. There are 2 streets.

Geography 
Mysovtsevo is located 32 km southwest of Ufa (the district's administrative centre) by road. Zhukovo is the nearest rural locality.

References 

Rural localities in Ufimsky District